A multi-family office (MFO) is an independent organization that supports multiple families to manage their entire wealth. Multi-family offices typically provide a variety of services including tax and estate planning, risk management, objective financial counsel, trusteeship, lifestyle management, coordination of professionals, investment advice, and philanthropic foundation management. Some multi-family offices are also known to offer personal services such as managing household staff and making travel arrangements. Because the customized services offered by a multi-family office can be costly, clients of a multi-family office typically have a net worth in excess of $50 million.

A multi-family office (MFO) is a commercial enterprise established to meet the investment, estate planning and, in some cases, the lifestyle and tax service needs of affluent families.

MFOs can be created in one of three ways:
 a single family office opens its doors to additional clients or merges with another single family office
 as a start up by a team of advisors (typically with some combination of investment, tax and or legal professional credentials)
 an existing financial institution (most often a bank or brokerage firm) creates an MFO subsidiary or division.

In the United States, many MFOs are registered investment advisors, some are trust companies and a handful are accounting or law firms.

History
The family office concept has its roots back in the 6th century. Then a majordomo was a person who would speak, make arrangements, or take charge for the affairs of the royal family and its wealth. Later in the 6th century, the upper nobility started to use these services of the majordomo as well. Hence, the concept of administratorship was invented.

The modern concept and understanding of family offices was developed in the 19th century. In 1838, the family of J.P. Morgan founded the House of Morgan, which managed the families' assets and in 1882, the Rockefellers founded their family office.

Many family offices have started their business as so called single family offices, where the family owns the family office and serves only the owner family. Instead of covering the entire operative costs, many owners of single family offices decided to offer its services to other families as well. This concept is called multi-family office or multi-client family office. Only a few multi-family offices have founded their business independently, without a large family backing it.

In addition, the development of the multi-family office came as a result of the growing number of wealthy families, as well as the rapid developments in technology within the financial markets which required greater sophistication and skill in financial advisors in the 1980s and 1990s.  The difficulty in attracting and retaining such talented employees became more difficult.  These changes, combined with the consolidation of the financial services industry, significantly diminished the role of the bank trust departments that traditionally served the wealthy families.  These trends resulted in an increased need and cost for family office-type services.  To defray such costs many families opened their family offices to non-family members, resulting in multi-family offices.

Characteristics
MFOs tend to have the following characteristics:

Independence: MFOs typically do not sell (traditional products that a family might typically encounter from a brokerage firm) and generally are not compensated for the products utilized by clients. MFOs usually follow a "service delivery model" holding themselves out as an objective provider of advice that places the interests of their clients first.

Breadth and Integration of Services: MFOs provide a wide array of services and typically oversee their clients' entire financial universe. MFOs will have full information about their clients investments, tax situation, estate plan and family dynamics. With this information the MFO can assist in structuring and administering the clients' financial universe in an optimal fashion.

Professionals with Diverse Skills and Deep Specialties: MFO professionals provide a wide array of advice and assistance to their clients. MFOs also have to be able to provide specialty knowledge on certain topics such as: income taxation, estate planning, and investments.

High Touch Services: MFOs have high average account sizes (usually in the tens of millions) and low client to employee ratios (around 3 to 1 range). Large account sizes combined with low client-to-employee ratios allows a great deal of focus and attention on each client family. Meetings with clients often occur many times a year.

Multi-Generational Planning: MFOs typically work with an entire family – the patriarch/matriarch, their children and grandchildren. Planning encompasses the family's goals which typically includes passing wealth down to lower generations in a tax efficient manner. Children and grandchildren are clients and are counseled on investments, taxes, estate planning, and philanthropy from an early age. MFOs often coordinate and moderate family meetings for their client families.

Outsourcing: MFOs do not typically provide all services in-house. It is common for some of the investment management to be outsourced to independent money managers. Custody and tax return preparation are also commonly outsourced.

Focus on Taxable Investor: Most MFOs have a myopic focus on taxable investors as the bulk of their client's assets are subject to short and long term capital gains.  This is unique to very high-net-worth families.  Most investment research (academic and financial service industry) is geared toward the institutional investor and foundations (with very different tax concerns than individuals and families).  The bulk of the research done for the individual investor relates to 401ks and IRAs.

Benefits
MFOs may have one or more of the following benefits:
Objective financial advice
Creative solutions to financial issues
Clearinghouse for financial, investment, tax and estate planning ideas
Cross-fertilization of ideas resulting from solving issues for multiple families
Services are typically "all you can eat" for asset based fee or flat retainer fee
Advice from professional team with diverse backgrounds
Coordination of other advisers
Proactive advice – a function of low client to employee ratio and frequency of meetings
Delivery of "best of breed" money managers, custody, insurance, loans, etc.
Negotiated cost savings with other financial providers (e.g. investment management, custody, trading costs)
Integration of client's estate planning, income taxes, investments, philanthropic goals and family situation

Typical services provided

 Trustee Services
 Coordination of Professionals
 Cash Management
 Global Asset Allocation and Investment Strategy Consulting
 Comprehensive Performance Reporting
 Investment Manager Selection and Monitoring
 Portfolio Management
 Estate Planning
 Philanthropic Planning
 Life Insurance Analysis
 Debt Structure and Analysis – Bank Financing
 Tax Return Preparation
 Foundation Management
 Entity Administration (FLPs, CLTs, CRTs, Installment Sales, etc.)
 Aircraft Consulting
 Risk Management & Asset Protection Consulting
 Fraud Detection/Accountability
 Real Estate Management
 Family Business Advisory
 Family Counseling/Family Meetings
 Sufficiency and Retirement Planning
 Document Management and Recordkeeping
 Bill Payment Services
 Personal Financial Statement Preparation

Multi-family office industry
The industry grew to $170 billion of assets under management in 2003, a 17% increase over the prior year; in 2004, the increase was 26.6%.

Notable multi-family offices
Hottinger Group, a privately owned independent firm with its roots in high finance dating back to 1786. From its London headquarters it oversees the financial and business needs of 200 families from 15 countries with $65 billion of collective wealth. Most recently awarded Family Office of the Year in 2017, 2019, 2020 & 2022 by the City of London Wealth Management Awards.
Bessemer Trust, an independent firm that was founded in 1907 and oversees more than $106 billion for over 2,300 families, foundations and endowments.
Stonehage Fleming, with $43 billion in assets under administration, including $11 billion in assets under management, and total revenues of about $160 million. Serving over 250 wealthy families (2014).
Rockefeller Capital Management, originally established in 1882 by the Rockefeller family as a private family office.

See also
 Family office
 Private foundation
 Investment management

References
 Sara Hamilton, "The Multi-Family Office Mania", Trusts & Estates, November 2002
 WebCPA, "Family Offices Come Downtown", March 2002
 Further explanations about services offered by family offices, July 2012

Notes

Family economics
Investment management